Shari Cantor (born 1960) is a Certified Public Accountant and politician from West Hartford, Connecticut. She is the Mayor of West Hartford.

Early life and education 
A native of West Hartford, Cantor attended Hall High School. She graduated magna cum laude from the University of Connecticut (UConn) with a degree in accounting.

Family 
She met her husband, Michael Cantor, while studying at the University of Connecticut.

They have four children together, all boys. Their youngest son was born with a serious heart defect, which has led to her volunteer leadership with the Connecticut Children's Medical Center and the American Heart Association.

Business career 
She has worked at Coopers & Lybrand and Cigna.

Political career 
Cantor joined the West Hartford town council in 2004 and became Deputy Mayor in 2012. In 2016 she became Mayor of West Hartford, her first two projects were the designation of a town Poet Laureate and making the town a “heart safe community." Even though West Hartford is an affluent town of 63,000 the office is unpaid. She is the de facto leader of the West Hartford Democrats. Challenges during her term as mayor have included conflict with the Metropolitan District of Connecticut and dealing with the effects of a decrease in state education aid.

She has been on the UConn board of trustees since 2014 and as of May 2019 she was one of two candidates under consideration to replace resigning chairman Thomas E. Kruger. Kruger had named her as his preferred successor over lobbyist and former Connecticut House Speaker Thomas D. Ritter, writing that "it’s time for the University board to be led by a woman.”

Awards and recognition 
Cantor was inducted into the UConn Hall of Fame in 2018.
Cantor was the winner of top honors nationally at the U.S. Conference of Mayors 14th Annual Climate Protection Awards.

References 

American accountants
Women accountants
Women mayors of places in Connecticut
Connecticut Democrats
1960 births
Living people
University of Connecticut alumni
Hall High School (Connecticut) alumni
21st-century American women